Mariam Bah (born 6 July 1976) is a two-time Olympic taekwondo competitor and a multiple-time medalist at the African Taekwondo Championships from Côte d'Ivoire. She first competed at the 2004 Summer Olympics in Athens, where she had an honor of carrying the national flag at the opening ceremony. Bah was eliminated in the first round after being defeated by Korea's Jang Ji-Won, with a score of 2–9. Because her opponent advanced into the final round and won the gold medal, Bah qualified for the repechage bout, where she was lost to Spain's Sonia Reyes in the first round. At her second Olympics in Beijing, Bah competed in the women's lightweight category (57 kg). In the first round, she fought against New Zealand's Robin Cheong, who made her debut at the Olympics. Neither of them had scored until Bah was given a defensive kick from her opponent. In the end, Bah was officially eliminated in the preliminary round of the competition.

References

External links

NBC Olympics Profile

1976 births
Living people
Ivorian female taekwondo practitioners
Taekwondo practitioners at the 2004 Summer Olympics
Taekwondo practitioners at the 2008 Summer Olympics
Olympic taekwondo practitioners of Ivory Coast
21st-century Ivorian women